"Here" is a 6-page comic strip by Richard McGuire (born 1957) published in Raw Volume 2 #1 in 1989. 
In 2010, McGuire announced a graphic novel version Here (expanded to 300 pages, full-color). It was published by Pantheon Books in December 2014.

Overview
The first panel of "Here" shows an unadorned corner of a room in a house. The 35 panels that follow all show the location in space depicted in the first panel at different points in time, ranging from the year 500,957,406,073 BCE to the year 2033 CE. The panels are not ordered chronologically, and most of the panels are subdivided into multiple panes to show different points in time within the same panel. A wide variety of people, animals, and furnishings are shown passing through the space, including several recurring characters, such as a woman shown cleaning the room in 1973, 1983, 1993, 1994, 1995 and 1996. The corner of the room itself is the most enduring presence in the story; panels show the house being constructed in 1902 and sheltering several generations of occupants before burning in a fire in 2029 and being demolished in 2030. The space is shown to be a barnyard in the 19th century before the house is built, and the site of open-air band concerts after the house has been .

"Here" has been recognized as a groundbreaking experiment with the formal properties of comics. Douglas Wolk wrote that its "influence has echoed through art comics for decades." Its influence is particularly notable in the work of Chris Ware, who wrote a lengthy essay on it in the magazine Comic Art #8. "Here" was also reprinted for the first time in that issue. It has been frequently anthologized since its original publication.

Film adaptation
In 2022, Deadline reported that a film adaptation is in development with Robert Zemeckis directing and co-writing with Eric Roth, and Tom Hanks starring; Robin Wright would later join the cast as well. Zemeckis and Hanks' studios ImageMovers and Playtone will produce. Miramax (under Paramount Pictures) eventually came on board as financier and international sales agent and Sony Pictures Classics acquired U.S. distribution rights to the film at the Cannes Film Market.

Citations

Further reading
 Hancock, Michael W. (2013). "Storytelling in Comics: Who, When, and Where in "Here"" (PDF, 4 pages). Illinois Mathematics and Science Academy. Comics and Graphic Novels. Paper 2. (abstract and additional PDF files for the Chris Ware article and the "Here" comic)

External links
 "Here" at Entrecomics (larger GIFs)
 "Here" at Rutgers University (smaller JPEGs, via Archive.org)
 "Here" (interactive edition)

1989 comics debuts
Short comics
Raw (magazine)
Pantheon Books graphic novels